The 1888 Indiana Hoosiers football team was an American football team that represented Indiana University Bloomington during the 1888 college football season. In Indiana's second season of intercollegiate football, economics professor Arthur B. Woodford returned as the school's football coach. As in 1887, Indiana played only one game, that game ending in a 6–6 tie with the team from nearby DePauw University at Greencastle, Indiana. The players on the 1888 team included Joseph W. Murphy, John C. Capron, and J. F. Newsom.

Schedule

References

Indiana
Indiana Hoosiers football seasons
College football undefeated seasons
College football winless seasons
Indiana Hoosiers football